David Lynn Harris was an American orthodontist who owned a chain of offices along with his wife, Clara Suarez Harris. The chain was particularly successful, and the couple was able to afford an upscale home and lifestyle in Friendswood, Texas. On July 24, 2002, Clara Harris confronted her husband in a hotel parking lot over an extramarital affair, then struck and ran over him with her Mercedes-Benz sedan, killing him in an act of mariticide. She was convicted of sudden passion and sentenced to 20 years in prison.

Marriage
Clara Suarez, a Colombian immigrant, was named "Mrs Colombia Houston" and worked as a dentist. She married David Harris on February 14, 1992, at the Nassau Bay Hilton, and raised three children: twin sons Brian and Bradley, born in 1998, and David's daughter Lindsey from a previous marriage. During his marriage to Clara, David began to have an affair with his former receptionist, Gail Bridges. Suspicious, Clara hired a private detective agency to monitor David, and on July 24, 2002, the agency notified her that he was at a hotel with his mistress.

Murder and trial
That evening, Clara went to the Hilton Hotel in Nassau Bay, Texas, to confront her husband and reportedly attacked Bridges in the lobby. Hotel employees escorted Clara to her Mercedes-Benz sedan. When David and Bridges came out of the hotel, Clara struck down her husband in the parking lot as her teenaged stepdaughter Lindsey sat in the passenger seat. According to the medical examiner's office, they could only be certain there was one tire mark on the body, but Lindsey and eyewitnesses assert Clara ran over David three times. David was dead at the scene, and Clara was charged with murder. 

Clara's trial began the following February. Lindsey testified against her stepmother, claiming she told her to stop the vehicle. The prosecution claimed Clara's actions were more than a crime of passion, but that she "wanted to hurt" David, as she was heard saying in a police interview. Also introduced at her trial was a videotape of the crime, recorded by the detective agency Clara had hired when she suspected David of the affair. The video was especially damning, as it showed her circling her Mercedes around the parking lot three times, although David is not clearly seen in the video. Clara then parks her car next to his body.

The defense's attempts to prove that Clara ran over David only once crumbled when the judge ruled their re-creation of the crime by a private consultant inadmissible in court. Her attorney explained what was in the report, using the consultant as an expert witness on the stand. They argued that Clara could only have run over David once, and that the turning radius of her Mercedes would not have allowed for her to sharply turn and run over him a second time. The prosecution admitted that it was a good argument, but countered by bringing in a police officer who had been present at the scene who pointed out another tire track on the pavement shown in a police photograph, the angle of which went directly to where David's body had been. 

Clara was advised not to take the stand. However, after watching days of testimony, she decided she had to speak. Taking the stand allowed parts of Clara's original interview, which her attorneys had previously gotten ruled inadmissible, to come into question. Only part of the interview was played; the jury heard Clara state that she "wanted to hurt" her husband, but not the portion where she said later in the interview, "I didn't want to kill him." This caused her attorney to collapse from the stress, causing the court to go to recess as he was taken to the hospital and later released. Clara contends that she did not see David when she ran into him with her car. Despite the medical examiner's report, the defense was unable to prove that she did not in fact run over him multiple times.

Clara was found guilty of murdering her husband. On February 14, 2003, she was sentenced to twenty years in prison – the maximum sentence allowed by the jury's "sudden passion" finding – and fined $10,000. She was incarcerated at the Mountain View Unit in Gatesville, Texas, where she converted school textbooks to Braille for blind students. Clara's sons, who are in the custody of family friends, were said to visit about once a month. She was denied parole in her first attempt on April 11, 2013, by the Texas Board of Pardons and Paroles. Her second parole request was denied in September 2016. However, she was granted parole in November 2017.

Aftermath
Harris was released on parole on May 11, 2018, and was released from parole in February of 2023.

In popular culture
A book titled Out of Control was written by Steven Long about the case. Published in 2004 by St. Martin's Paperbacks, the book follows the story of the murder and the reasons behind it. This story was the inspiration for the completion of a chapter in the Mexican series Mujeres Asesinas "Killer Women." The chapter title is Luz, overwhelming (Luz, arrolladora).

The case was profiled on the Oxygen Network series Snapped in 2004, on ABC News's 20/20 in 2006, and on Investigation Discovery's Deadly Women in 2010. It was also the topic of Suburban Madness, a Lifetime Original movie, starring Elizabeth Peña and Brett Cullen.

See also
 Crime in Houston

References

2002 in Texas
2002 murders in the United States
Deaths by person in Texas
Harris County, Texas
July 2002 events in the United States
Mariticides
Murder in Texas